The Ladies Norwegian Open is a professional golf tournament on the Swedish Golf Tour and featured on the LET Access Series schedule in 2015 and 2016.

Highlights
The 2015 edition saw a record-breaking 14-hole sudden-death playoff between Johanna Gustavsson of Sweden and Natalia Escuriola of Spain. Both players recorded an opening bogey on the first playoff hole, the 368 yard par-4 9th at Larvik Golf Club, which they played three times before alternating between the 1st and 9th holes until the 10th extra hole. They then moved back to the 9th hole until Gustavsson was able to break the deadlock on the 14th extra hole with a birdie three. 

In 2016, the final day featured a special format, as it was played alongside the men's Norwegian Open over the Skjeberg course. It was the first time an event on the LET Access Series has featured this format, which follows that of the Oates Victorian Open, played at the Beach Links in Victoria, Australia.

Winners

See also
Ladies Norwegian Challenge

References

External links

LET Access Series events
Golf tournaments in Norway